Aliabad (also Romanized as ‘Alīābād) is a village in Howmeh Rural District, in the Central District of Iranshahr County, Sistan and Baluchestan Province, Iran. At the 2006 census, its population was 2,984, in 581 families.

References 

Populated places in Iranshahr County